Peter Kirstein may refer to:

 Peter T. Kirstein (1933–2020), British computer scientist who played a significant role in the creation of the Internet
 Petrus Kirstenius (1577–1640), German physician and orientalist